The First Nations of New Brunswick, Canada number more than 16,000, mostly Miꞌkmaq and Maliseet (Wolastoqiyik). Although the Passamaquoddy maintain a land claim at Saint Andrews, New Brunswick and historically occurred in New Brunswick, they have no reserves in the province, and have no official status in Canada.

List of First Nations 
New Brunswick is home to 15 First Nations.

List of Indian reserves 
New Brunswick is home to 32 Indian reserves, of which 18 are recognized as census subdivisions by Statistics Canada.

References

External links
Aboriginal Affairs in New Brunswick

 
First Nations